This is a list of sister cities in the United States state of Colorado. Sister cities, known in Europe as town twins, are cities which partner with each other to promote human contact and cultural links, although this partnering is not limited to cities and often includes counties, regions, states and other sub-national entities.

Many Colorado jurisdictions work with foreign cities through Sister Cities International, an organization whose goal is to "promote peace through mutual respect, understanding, and cooperation."

A
Arvada

 Jinzhou, China
 Kyzylorda, Kazakhstan

Aspen

 Abetone Cutigliano, Italy
 Bariloche, Argentina
 Chamonix-Mont-Blanc, France
 Davos, Switzerland
 Garmisch-Partenkirchen, Germany
 Queenstown-Lakes, New Zealand
 Shimukappu, Japan

Aurora

 Adama, Ethiopia
 Jacó, Costa Rica
 Seongnam, South Korea

B
Beaver Creek
 Lech, Austria

Boulder

 Dushanbe, Tajikistan
 Jalapa, Nicaragua
 Kathmandu, Nepal
 Kisumu, Kenya
 Lhasa, China
 El Mante, Mexico
 Nablus, Palestine
 Ramat HaNegev, Israel
 Yamagata, Japan
 Yateras, Cuba

Brighton
 Ziębice, Poland

Broomfield
 Ueda, Japan

C
Cañon City

 Chalchicomula de Sesma, Mexico
 Kahoku, Japan
 Valday, Russia

Colorado Springs

 Canterbury-Bankstown, Australia
 Bishkek, Kyrgyzstan
 Fujiyoshida, Japan
 Kaohsiung, Taiwan
 Kranj, Slovenia
 Nuevo Casas Grandes, Mexico
 Olympia, Greece

Commerce City
 Nanning, China

D
Denver

 Axum, Ethiopia
 Brest, France
 Chennai, India
 Cuernavaca, Mexico
 Karmiel, Israel
 Kunming, China
 Nairobi, Kenya
 Potenza, Italy
 Takayama, Japan
 Ulaanbaatar, Mongolia

Durango

 Chyamtang, Nepal
 Durango, Spain
 Victoria de Durango, Mexico

E
Estes Park
 Monteverde, Costa Rica

Evans
 Ashby-de-la-Zouch, England, United Kingdom

G
Grand Junction
 El Espino (Jucuarán), El Salvador

Greeley
 Moriya, Japan

Gunnison
 Majkhali, India

L
Lakewood
 Sutherland, Australia

Lamar
 Pilsting, Germany

Littleton
 Bega Valley, Australia

Longmont

 Chino, Japan
 Zapotlán el Grande, Mexico

M
Mancos
 Feins, France

P
Pueblo

 Bergamo, Italy
 Chihuahua, Mexico
 Lucca Sicula, Italy
 Maribor, Slovenia
 Puebla, Mexico
 Weifang, China

S
Steamboat Springs

 Saas-Fee, Switzerland
 San Martín de los Andes, Argentina

V
Vail
 St. Moritz, Switzerland

References

Colorado
Cities in Colorado
Lists of populated places in Colorado